Jagadamba is an epithet used to address a Hindu goddess, primarily applied to Adi Shakti in literature.

Literature

Ramcharitmanas 
In Ramcharitmanas, a version of the Ramayana by Tulsidas, after Angadha meets Ravana, the latter remarks thus:

नृप अभिमान मोह बस किंबा। 
हरि आनिहु सीता जगदंबा॥
अब सुभ कहा सुनहु तुम्ह मोरा। 
सब अपराध छमिहि प्रभु तोरा॥
सादर जनकसुता करि आगें। 
एहि बिधि चलहु सकल भय त्यागें॥

This translates to:

"O King of Lanka, either out of pride or lust you had kidnapped Jagdamba (mother of the world) Sita, wife of Hari (Rama). The best course now would be to proceed with Shri Sita to restore her to Shri Rama without any apprehension".

Temples
 Devi Jagadambi Temple, is a temple dedicated to goddess Parvati at Khajuraho, Madhya Pradesh, India.
Mahalakshmi Ambabai Temple, is a temple dedicated to goddess Lakshmi in Kolhapur, Maharashtra, India
Shree Jagadamba Devi Temple in Kasaragod, Kerala, India

References

Hindu goddesses
Lakshmi

Shaktism